Avinguda Carrilet, also known as L'Hospitalet Avinguda Carrilet, is an interchange complex underneath Avinguda Carrilet in the L'Hospitalet de Llobregat municipality, to the south-west of Barcelona, in Catalonia, Spain. It consists of a railway station on the Llobregat–Anoia Line and a Barcelona Metro line 1 (L1) station. The Llobregat–Anoia Line station is served by Barcelona Metro line 8 (L8), Baix Llobregat Metro lines S33, S4 and S8, and commuter rail lines R5, R6, R50 and R60. The services on the Llobregat–Anoia Line (including the L8) are operated by Ferrocarrils de la Generalitat de Catalunya (FGC), whilst the L1 is operated by Transports Metropolitans de Barcelona (TMB).

The original at-grade station for the Llobregat–Anoia Line was opened in 1912 by the company Camino de Hierro del Nordeste ("Northeastern Railway"). On , the line's section between Sant Josep and Cornellà Riera stations was put underground and the current station started operating. The L1 station dates from 1987, when the line was extended southwards from Torrassa station. It served as the L1's southern terminus until 1989, when that line was extended to Hospital de Bellvitge station.

The platforms used by the Llobregat–Anoia Line are located between Rambla de la Marina and Plaça de la Mare de Déu de Montserrat. They comprise two island platforms, each flanked by a pair of tracks, with the two inner tracks on the main line and the outer tracks on loops off the main line. The L1 platforms are located underneath Rambla de la Marina, between Avinguda Carrilet and Carrer Prat de la Riba, comprising two  side platforms.

Accesses
The station has the following entrances:

 Avinguda Carrilet 
 Carrer Prat de la Riba

Notes

References

External links
 
 Avinguda Carrilet listing at the Transports Metropolitans de Barcelona (TMB) website
 Information and photos of the Llobregat–Anoia Line and L1 stations at trenscat.cat 
 Information and photos of the Llobregat–Anoia Line station at WEFER 

Railway stations in Spain opened in 1987
Barcelona Metro line 1 stations
Barcelona Metro line 8 stations
Stations on the Llobregat–Anoia Line
Railway stations in L'Hospitalet de Llobregat
Railway stations in Spain opened in 1912
Railway stations in Spain opened in 1985
1912 establishments in Spain
Railway stations located underground in Spain
1985 establishments in Spain